Puig de Pastuira is a mountain of Catalonia, Spain. It can be found to the north-west of the village of Setcases in the eastern Pyrenees. 

Its exact location and summit is identified differently by different maps and sources.
Some sources state that it is an alternative name for the mountain Les Borregues.

Other sources and maps identify the summit as a point on the south-eastern spur of Les Borregues. The Riu de Pastuira, or Torrent de Pastuira, is a stream which starts below this summit and runs south-east, joining the Ter south of Setcases.

See also
Mountains of Catalonia

References

Mountains of Catalonia
Mountains of the Pyrenees